Colaspis viriditincta is a species of leaf beetle from North America. It is distributed in Arizona and Mexico. It was first described by the American entomologist Charles Frederic August Schaeffer in 1919. The specific name, viriditincta, is derived from the Latin for "green-tinged".

References

Further reading

 

Eumolpinae
Articles created by Qbugbot
Beetles described in 1920
Beetles of North America
Taxa named by Charles Frederic August Schaeffer